The 1989–90 season was the 91st completed season of The Football League.

Liverpool overhauled a greatly improved Aston Villa side to win their 18th league championship trophy and their fifth major trophy in as many seasons under Kenny Dalglish's management. Gary Lineker's arrival at Tottenham Hotspur saw the North Londoners occupy third place after a season of improvement.

In this season, London had eight entrants in the top-flight, the highest number of participants ever.

Luton Town stayed up on goal difference at the expense of Sheffield Wednesday, while Charlton's four-year spell in the First Division came to an end at the beginning of May. Millwall were rooted to the bottom of the division despite briefly topping the league in September.

Leeds United finally returned to the top flight after an eight-year exile, as Howard Wilkinson's side lifted the Second Division championship trophy thanks to a superior goal difference over runners-up Sheffield United, who won their second successive promotion under Dave Bassett.

Swindon Town won the Second Division playoff final but Sunderland were promoted instead after the Swindon board admitted a series of financial irregularities. Swindon were initially demoted to the Third Division and replaced by Tranmere, the division's losing Play-Off finalists, but this decision was later reversed on appeal.

AFC Bournemouth, Stoke City and Bradford City occupied the relegation places. Bournemouth did not return to second tier of English football until the 2013–14 season.

The city of Bristol was celebrating after Rovers were crowned champions and City finished runners-up in the Third Division to gain promotion. The third promotion spot was secured by playoff winners Notts County, who beat Leyland DAF Trophy (i.e. EFL Trophy) winners Tranmere Rovers at Wembley.

Walsall suffered a second successive relegation and would be joined in the Fourth Division the following season by Blackpool, Cardiff City and Northampton Town.

Exeter City were crowned Fourth Division champions and went up to the Third Division along with runners-up Grimsby Town, third-placed Southend United and playoff winners Cambridge United. Newly promoted Maidstone United almost ended their first league season with success, but their promotion hopes were ended by playoff failure.

Colchester United were relegated from the league and replaced by Football Conference champions Darlington, who regained their league status just one season after losing it.

Final league tables and results 

The tables and results below are reproduced here in the exact form that they can be found at The Rec.Sport.Soccer Statistics Foundation website, with home and away statistics separated.

First Division

Liverpool won the First Division title for the 18th time, finishing nine points ahead of their nearest rivals Aston Villa, who had emerged as title contenders just two seasons after being promoted, sealing England's solitary UEFA Cup place after the ban on English clubs in European competitions was lifted after five years, although Liverpool missed out on a European Cup place following UEFA's decision to exclude them from European competitions for at least one more season. Tottenham Hotspur improved on their sixth-place finish in 1989 by finishing third. Defending champions Arsenal slipped to fourth, and newly promoted Chelsea finished fifth.

Manchester United finished a disappointing 13th in the league – their lowest since relegation in 1974 – but compensated for this by winning the FA Cup, equalling the record of seven wins in the competition.

Millwall, who briefly topped the table in mid September, went down in bottom place after winning just two more games all season. Charlton Athletic's four-year spell in the First Division ended in relegation, and the final relegation place went to a Sheffield Wednesday side who went down on goal difference after a late turnaround in form for Luton Town.

First Division results

First Division maps

Second Division
A tight race for promotion from the Second Division saw the two automatic promotion places decided on the final day of the season, with Leeds United going up as champions after an eight-year exile from the First Division, followed by their Yorkshire rivals Sheffield United, who finished runners-up to clinch a second successive promotion and end their 14-year absence from the First Division.

Swindon Town beat Sunderland 1–0 in the playoff final to secure a First Division place for the first time, only for promotion to be withdrawn weeks later for financial irregularities. The Football League promoted Sunderland to the First Division in their place, and demoted them to the Third Division, although they were allowed to remain in the Second Division on appeal. Newcastle United, whose new signing Mick Quinn topped the Football League goal charts with 32 goals, had squandered their chance on an immediate return to the First Division by losing to Sunderland in the playoff semi-finals. Blackburn Rovers, who had last played First Division football in the mid-1960s, lost in the other semi-final.

Two of the teams who just missed out on the playoffs enjoyed memorable cup runs. West Ham United reached the semi-finals of the League Cup, while Oldham Athletic were semi-finalists in the FA Cup and beaten finalists in the League Cup.

Stoke City were relegated to the Third Division after finishing bottom of the Second Division, and were joined in the drop zone by Bradford City and AFC Bournemouth. Middlesbrough, who finished fourth from bottom, narrowly avoided a second successive relegation.

Second Division results

Second Division play-offs

The semifinals were decided over two legs. The final consisted of only a single match.The full results can be found at: Football League Division Two play-offs 1990.

Second Division maps

Third Division

The two automatic promotion places in the Third Division were clinched by the two Bristol clubs, with Rovers finishing champions and City finishing runners-up, having both been relegated from the Second Division nine years before. The playoffs were won by Notts County.

Walsall finished bottom of the Fourth Division and suffered a second consecutive relegation in their final season at Fellows Park, leaving them in the Fourth Division for their first season at the new Bescot Stadium. Joining them in the bottom four were Blackpool, Cardiff City and Northampton Town.

Third Division results

Third Division play-offs

The semifinals were decided over two legs. The final consisted of only a single match.The full results can be found at: Football League Division Three play-offs 1990.

Third Division maps

Fourth Division
Exeter City clinched the Fourth Division title to end their six-year spell in the league's basement division. They were joined by Southend United, relegated the previous season, and by a Grimsby Town side who had spent two seasons in the Fourth Division since their most recent relegation. The final promotion place went to playoff winners Cambridge United, who triumphed 1–0 over Chesterfield in their first professional Wembley final with a goal from promising young striker Dion Dublin. Losing semi-finalists in the playoffs were newly promoted Maidstone United, and a Stockport County side whose striker Brett Angell was the division's top scorer on 23 league goals.

Colchester United, who had managed a remarkable escape from relegation the previous season under inspirational new manager Jock Wallace, were unable to escape the drop this time, going down after 40 years in the Football League and being replaced by a Darlington side who had dropped out of the league 12 months before.

Fourth Division results

Fourth Division play-offs

The semifinals were decided over two legs. The final consisted of only a single match.The full results can be found at: Football League Division Four play-offs 1990.

Fourth Division maps

See also
 1989–90 in English football

References

 
English Football League seasons